Abasaheb Garware College of Arts and Science (commonly referred to as Garware College) is a college located in Pune, India. It is run by the Maharashtra Education Society, a private education institution founded by Vasudeo Balwant Phadke, Vaman Prabhakar Bhave and Laxman Narhar Indapurkar in 1860. The college was established in 1945 and named as "M.E.S College of Arts and Science". It was renamed to its present name in 1970s after a charitable donation by the industrialist Abasaheb Garware to the society.

Garware College offers undergraduate programs in Arts and Science. Approximately 5000 students study in this college.

Admissions
Admission forms are available on the college website and in the college office. A student can choose which program he wants to opt.

Programs offered
Garware College is an Arts and Science college. The college offers 11th &12th grade studies (10+2) as well as undergraduate programs in the fields listed below.

Arts
B.A. in English
BA in Marathi
BA in Hindi
BA in Sanskrit
BA in Mass Communication
BA in History
BA in Psychology

Science
BSc in Chemistry
BSc in Botany
BSc in Physics
BSc in Mathematics
BSc in Computer Sciences
BSc in Statistics
BSc in Biotechnology
BSc in Microbiology
 MSc in Organic chemistry
 MSc in Analytical chemistry
 MSc in Biotechnology
 MSc in Biodiversity
 MSc in Microbiology

See also 
 Notable institutions run by Maharashtra Education Society (MES)

References

External links
 

Universities and colleges in Pune
Maharashtra Education Society
Colleges affiliated to Savitribai Phule Pune University